Keiki (written: 慶樹 or 慶記) is both a feminine and a masculine Japanese given name. Notable people with the name include:

, Japanese volleyball player
, Japanese footballer
, Japanese hurdler

Japanese feminine given names
Japanese masculine given names
Japanese unisex given names